William Robert Grossmith, also known as Master Grossmith (1818–1899), was a 19th-century child actor, the eldest son of William Grossmith, who then established a second career as a maker of prosthetic limbs.

Career 
Grossmith was known as the 'Infant Roscius' or 'Young Roscius' as he began acting at a very young age. In 1825 a pamphlet was published publicising this prodigy child actor with the title The Life of the Celebrated Infant Roscius, Master Grossmith of Reading, Berks, only seven years and a quarter Old. Another, retitled to not yet nine years of age, was published in 1827.

He also made appearances with a younger sibling, Master B Grossmith.
After retiring from the stage he made a second career out of prosthetic limb manufacture. In fact, so well-respected were William Grossmith' products that in 1856 he published a book on the subject: Amputations and Artificial Limbs (or Grossmith on Amputations, Artificial Legs, Hands &c.) Legacy 

A painting of Grossmith as Richard in William Shakespeare's Richard III''  by G. Hancock is in the Victoria and Albert Museum. A print of Grossmith as a child is in the British Museum collection.

Artificial limbs made by Grossmith in his later career are held in the Science Museum.

References 

1818 births
1899 deaths
English male child actors
Medical device manufacturers